The 2003 Chelmsford Borough Council election took place on 1 May 2003 to elect members of Chelmsford Borough Council in England. This was on the same day as other local elections.

There were boundary changes across the council area resulting in new wards being created. The number of seats on the council was increased from 56 to 57 seats.

Results summary

Ward results

Bicknacre & East & West Hanningfield

Boreham & The Leighs

Broomfield & The Walthams

Chelmer Village & Beaulieu Park

Chelmsford Rural West

Galleywood

Goat Hall

Great Baddow East

Great Baddow West

The Lawns

Little Baddow, Danbury & Sandon

Marconi

Moulsham & Central

Moulsham Lodge

Patching Hall

Rettendon & Runwell

St. Andrew's

South Hanningfield, Stock & Margaretting

South Woodham - Chetwood & Collingwood

South Woodham - Elmwood & Woodville

Springfield North

Trinity

Waterhouse Farm

Writtle

References 

May 2003 events in the United Kingdom
2003 English local elections
2003
2000s in Essex